Faustina Niusila Opeloge (born ~2005) is a Samoan Weightlifter. She won a gold medal at the 2022 Pacific Mini Games. She is the daughter of Commonwealth Games gold medalist Niusila Opeloge.

Opeloge was educated at Leififi College. She competed at the 2019 Pacific Games in Apia at the age of 14, winning a gold medal in powerlifting. At the 2022 Pacific Mini Games in Saipan, Northern Mariana Islands she won gold in the 81 kg category. She also won gold in the 2022 Oceania Senior Championships.

References

External links
 

Living people
Samoan female weightlifters
21st-century Samoan people
Year of birth missing (living people)